Katha Township  is a township in Katha District in the Sagaing Region of Burma. The principal town is Katha. The township is served by a branch (east-west) railway line that leaves the main line just north of Indaw.

Notes

External links
Maplandia World Gazetteer - map showing the township boundary

Townships of Sagaing Region